Shoolpaneshwar Wildlife Sanctuary is a protected area in India's Gujarat state, located in the western Satpura Range south of the Narmada River and is  large. It shares a common boundary with Madhya Pradesh and Maharashtra. It encompasses mixed dry deciduous forest, riverine forest, few  pockets of moist teak forest, agricultural fields and two water reservoirs.
It was established in 1982.

Ecosystem
The physical aspect is dominated by Rajpipla hills. Dhanmal is the highest peak in this region. The general slope is towards west. The sanctuary has a vast undulating terrain, lush ever pervading greenery, tall canopy, deep valleys, sombre rocks, gentle streams, and waterfalls. All of these are in the Vindhyan and Satpuran ranges.

Zarwani Waterfall

The Zarwani Waterfall is deep inside the sanctuary.

Flora
The Shoolpaneshwar Wildlife Sanctuary is a part of the North Western Ghats moist deciduous forests ecoregion. The forests are moist deciduous with a few small dry bamboo brakes, a few pockets of moist teak forest in hilly areas, degraded scrub forest, and riverine forest bordering Terav and Narmada Rivers and small water courses. The hilly tract of the sanctuary supports forests harboring floral and faunal elements, which bear similarities to those in the Himalayas and Western Ghats. It is also a major watershed feeding two major reservoirs thus conserving the soil and water. There are vast groves of bamboo, and the sanctuary has 575 species of flowering plants.

Fauna
The sanctuary was initially established for the protection of the sloth bear. A rusty-spotted cat was sighted for the time in 1991.

The Shoolpaneshwar Wildlife Sanctuary's herpetofauna includes Indian softshell turtle, Indian flapshell turtle, Bengal monitor, Indian rock python, red sand boa, Indian krait, Russell's viper, Indian chameleon, rock agama, Brooke's house gecko, Yellow-bellied house gecko, oriental garden lizard and a small population of Mugger crocodile. Frogs recorded include Ramanella species, Asian common toad, marbled toad, ornate narrow-mouthed frog, Indian skipping frog, Indian tree frog, green pond frog, Indian bullfrog, cricket frog and Indian burrowing frog

Other mammalian fauna occurring includes the Indian leopard, leopard cat, rhesus macaque, chousingha, barking deer, pangolin, chital, large Indian civet, palm civet, Indian porcupine and feral dogs.
Locally extinct mammal species include Indian giant squirrel, tiger and gaur.

Birds, including Alexandrine parakeet, grey jungle fowl, red jungle fowl, crested serpent eagle, shikra, sparrow hawk, great horned owl and grey hornbill are found here.

Access and accommodation
There are rest houses to stay at Bharuch, Dediapada, Rajpipla, and the sanctuary.

See also
 Arid Forest Research Institute
 Bansda National Park
 Dangs' Forest
 Dumkhal
 Jambughoda Wildlife Sanctuary
 Purna Wildlife Sanctuary

External links
 Shoolpaneshwar Wild Life Sanctuary

References

Wildlife sanctuaries in Gujarat
Narmada district
North Western Ghats moist deciduous forests
Environment of Gujarat
Wildlife sanctuaries of the Western Ghats
1982 establishments in Gujarat
Protected areas established in 1982